Stephen Gottschalk (c. 1941 – 10 January 2005) was an historian of the Christian Science church, the Church of Christ, Scientist. A lifelong Christian Scientist, Gottschalk worked from 1978 until 1990 for the church's Committee on Publication in Boston, an organization set up by Mary Baker Eddy (1821–1910), the founder of Christian Science, to protect her own and the church's reputation. He left the committee in 1990 after disagreeing with the church's handling of internal criticism.

Gottschalk was the author of The Emergence of Christian Science in American Religious Life (1973) and Rolling Away the Stone: Mary Baker Eddy's Challenge to Materialism (2005). 

Background
Born in Beverley Hills, California, Gottschalk graduated from Harvard School, a former military school in Los Angeles. He obtained a BA in 1962 from Occidental College, an MA in 1963 from the University of California, Berkeley, and a PhD in history in 1969, also from UC Berkeley, for a thesis entitled The emergence of Christian science in American religious life, 1885–1910; the thesis became his first book, published in 1973. From 1967 to 1975 he was an assistant, then associate, professor of history in the department of government and humanities at the Naval Postgraduate School in Monterey, California.

From 1978 until 1990 Gottschalk worked for the Christian Science church's Committee on Publication in Boston, but left after a disagreement about the church's direction. In 1989 he gave an interview to  U.S. News & World Report in which he said the church had become "worldly"; he was concerned about the amount of money it had spent during the 1980s on radio and television services. In March 1990 he told the church's board of directors that he believed it was suppressing internal dissent, and left his position shortly afterwards. From then until his death he worked as an independent scholar.

Selected works
Rolling Away the Stone: Mary Baker Eddy's Challenge to Materialism, Indiana University Press, 2005.
"Christian Science and Harmonialism," in Lippy and Williams, eds., Encyclopedia of the American Religious Experience: Studies of Traditions and Movements, Charles Scribner's Sons, 1988.
" "Theodicy after Auschwitz and the Reality of God," Union Seminary Quarterly Review, 1987, nos. 3–4, pp. 77–91.
"Christian Science" and "Mary Baker Eddy," in Mircea Eliade, ed., The Encyclopedia of Religion, Collier Macmillan, 1987.
"Critic's Corner: Update on Christian Science," Theology Today, April 1987, pp. 111–115.
"Christian Science Today: Resuming the Dialogue," Christian Century, 17 December 1986, pp. 1146–1148.
The Emergence of Christian Science in American Religious Life, University of California Press, 1973.
Essays in American Naturalism, Occidental College, 1962.

Notes

2005 deaths
American Christian Scientists
Christian Science writers
Year of birth uncertain